Nina Freeman (born March 15, 1990) is an American video game designer known for her games with themes of sexuality and self-reflection. A former game designer at Fullbright, she developed and published numerous video games and is a co-founder of the Code Liberation Foundation, a non-for-profit organization that makes an effort to diversify employment within STEAM fields.

Academic career and personal life 
While a student at Pace University in Lower Manhattan, New York, Freeman was drawn to the work of Frank O’Hara and other poets of the New York School. She admired how they documented their lives through verses that were witty, conversational, and confessional all at once.

As a teenager, Freeman was a devoted player of Final Fantasy Online, an MMORPG.

Works, awards, and accomplishments 
Freeman developed her first game in 2012 based on a science fiction poem she wrote, though it remains unreleased.

In 2013, Freeman co-founded the Code Liberation Foundation on International Women's Day, a program offering free development workshops in order to facilitate more women to create video games.

Her game Bum Rush (2016) debuted at NYU Game Center 2015 No Quarter event and was released for free on July 6, 2016, for OS X and Windows.

She was included in Forbes 30 Under 30 2016 list of influential video game industry figures.

Her autobiographical game How Do You Do It deals with the discovery of sexuality through toy dolls after viewing the movie Titanic. It was developed during the 2014 Global Game Jam and was a finalist at the Independent Games Festival and Indiecade.

In 2015, Freeman released Cibele. The game tells the story of a teenage girl, engaged in a whirlwind online romance with a fellow gamer, and is based on a personal experience she had during her college years. The game gained praise for its characters and intimate stories and received the Nuovo Award at the 2016 Independent Games Festival.

At Fullbright, she worked as a game and level designer for their second release, Tacoma. The game sold fewer copies than the studio's previous game Gone Home, but made enough sales to allow them to continue developing games.

In January 2020, Freeman resigned from Fullbright to focus on her own projects, working on a narrative domestic horror game with her partner, Jake Jefferies.

In 2021, Freeman released Last Call, which was nominated for the Excellence in Narrative award at the 2022 Independent Games Festival.

As of 2022, Freeman has expressed the desire to make personal games about sex and human relationships. Her ultimate goal for each game is to elicit what she calls “player-character embodiment,” as in Cibele. The game is partially inspired by Freeman's experience of finding a real-life partner through an MMORPG, and exploring how these relationships manifest. The gameplay is said to alternate between exploring files on a simulated version of a desktop and controlling an avatar in a fictional MMORPG. A release date is yet to be announced.

Notable works 
Cibele, 2015 indie video game. 

Tacoma, 2017 action-adventure game (level design).

We Met in May, 2019 indie video game.

Last Call, 2021 indie video game.

References

External links 

 
https://www.pace.edu/dyson/dyson-digital-digest/spring-2016/poet-turned-indie-gamer-nina-freeman
http://ninasays.so/games/
http://www.interviewwithanartist.net/ninafreeman/
https://www.pace.edu/magazine/features/30-under-30/nina-freeman
http://www.digiart21.org/art/cibele

American video game designers
Polytechnic Institute of New York University alumni
Living people
1990 births
Women video game designers